Yichun may refer to:

Yichun, Heilongjiang (伊春市), prefecture-level city
Yichun, Jiangxi (宜春市), prefecture-level city
Yichun dialect, dialect of Gan Chinese spoken in Yichun, Jiangxi
Yichun District (伊春区), Yichun, Heilongjiang